Saint Innocent of Alaska (August 26, 1797 – March 31, 1879, O.S.), also known as Saint Innocent Metropolitan of Moscow (Russian: Святитель Иннокентий Митрополит Московский) was a Russian Orthodox missionary priest, then the first Orthodox bishop and archbishop in the Americas, and finally the Metropolitan of Moscow and all Russia. Remembered for his missionary work, scholarship, and leadership in Alaska and the Russian Far East during the 19th century, he is known for his abilities as a scholar, linguist, and administrator, as well as his great zeal for his work.

As a missionary priest he took his wife and family with him. In these territories he learned several languages and dialects of the indigenous peoples. He wrote many of the earliest scholarly works about the native peoples of Alaska, including dictionaries and grammars for their languages for which he devised writing systems; also, he wrote religious works in, and translated parts of the Bible into, several of these languages. His books were published beginning in 1840.

Early life and education
Saint Innocent was born Ivan Evseyevich Popov (Иван Евсеевич Попов) on August 26, 1797, into the family of a church server in the village of Anginskoye, Verkholensk District, Irkutsk Governorate, in Russia. His father, Evsey Popov, died when Ivan was six, and Ivan lived with his uncle, the parish deacon, in Anga. In 1807 at age 10, Ivan entered the Irkutsk Theological Seminary, where the rector renamed him Veniaminov in honor of the recently deceased Bishop Veniamin of Irkutsk.

In 1817, he married a local priest's daughter named Catherine. On May 18 that year, Ivan Veniaminov was ordained a deacon of the Church of the Annunciation in Irkutsk.

After completing his studies in 1818, Veniaminov was appointed a teacher in a parish school. On May 18, 1821, he was ordained a priest to serve in the Church of the Annunciation in Irkutsk. In Russian he was known as Father Ioann, the religious version of Ivan.

Ministry in Alaska
At the beginning of 1823, Bishop Michael of Irkutsk received instructions to send a priest to the island of Unalaska in the Aleutian Islands of Alaska. Father Ioann Veniaminov volunteered to go and on May 7, 1823, he departed from Irkutsk, accompanied by his aging mother, his brother Stefan, his wife, and their son, Innocent, an infant. After a difficult yearlong journey by land and water, they arrived at Unalaska on July 29, 1824.

After Father Ioann and his family built and moved into an earthen hut, he set about studying the local languages and dialects. He trained some of his new parishioners in Russian building techniques. With them he undertook the construction of Holy Ascension Church, which was finished the following July.

Father Ioann's parish included the island of Unalaska and the neighboring groups of Fox and Pribilof islands,  occupied by indigenous people who had been converted to Christianity before his arrival. They also retained many of their earlier religious beliefs and customs. Father Ioann often traveled between the islands in a canoe, battling the stormy ocean in the Gulf of Alaska.

By his travels through the islands, Father Ioann Veniaminov became familiar with the local dialects.  In a short time he mastered six of the dialects. He devised an alphabet using Cyrillic letters for the most widely used dialect, the Unangan dialect of Aleut. In 1828, he translated portions of the Bible and other church material into that dialect. In 1829, he journeyed to the Bering Sea coast of the Alaskan mainland and preached to the people there.

In 1834, Father Ioann was transferred to Sitka Island, to the town of Novoarkhangelsk, later called Sitka. He devoted himself to the Tlingit people and studied their language and customs. From his studies there, he wrote the scholarly works [http://www.asna.ca/alaska/research/zamechaniya.pdf Notes on the Kolushchan and Kodiak Tongues] and Other Dialects of the Russo-American Territories, with a Russian-Kolushchan Glossary.

In 1836, Father Veniaminov made the journey south on a pastoral tour of the southernmost extent of Russian America, landing at Fort Ross in Northern California. While there he conducted a census and performed the sacraments of marriage and baptism for the Russian population and local natives.

Kamchatka ministry

In 1838, Father Ioann journeyed to St. Petersburg (where on Christmas Day 1839 he was promoted to archpriest), Moscow and Kiev to report on his activities and request an expansion of the Church's activities in Russian America. While he was there, he received notice that his wife had died during her visit to Irkutsk. He requested permission to return to his hometown. Instead, church officials suggested that he take vows as a monk.  Father Ioann at first ignored these suggestions, but, on November 29, 1840, he was tonsured a monk with the name Innocent in honor of Saint Innocent, the first bishop of Irkutsk (†1731, commemorated on November 26). He was elevated to the rank of Archimandrite.

On December 15, 1840, Archimandrite Innocent was consecrated Bishop of Kamchatka  and Kuril Islands in Russia and the Aleutian Islands in Russian America.  His see was located in Novoarkhangelsk (Sitka), to which he returned in September 1841. He spent the next nine years administering his diocese as well as taking several long missionary journeys to its remote areas.

On April 21, 1850, Bishop Innocent was elevated to Archbishop. In 1852 the Yakut area was admitted to the Kamchatka Diocese. In September 1853 Archbishop Innocent took up permanent residence in the town of Yakutsk. Innocent took frequent trips throughout his enlarged diocese.  He devoted much energy to the translation of the scriptures and service books into the Yakut (Sakha) language.

In April 1865 Archbishop Innocent was appointed a member of the Holy Governing Synod of the Russian Orthodox Church.

Metropolitan of Moscow
On November 19, 1867, he was appointed the Metropolitan of Moscow, succeeding his friend and mentor, Saint Filaret, who had died.  As metropolitan, he undertook revisions of many church texts that contained errors, raised funds to improve the living conditions of impoverished priests, and established a retirement home for clergy.

Death and legacy

Innocent died on March 31, 1879. He was buried on April 5, 1879, at Trinity-St. Sergius Lavra, outside Moscow.

Sainthood 
On  the Russian Orthodox Church, acting on the official request of the Orthodox Church in America, glorified (canonized) Innocent as a saint, giving him the title "Enlightener of the Aleuts, Apostle to America."

Innocent's feast day is celebrated by the Orthodox Church three times a year: March 31, the date of his repose according to the Julian Calendar (April 13 N.S.); October 6, the anniversary of his canonization (September 23 O.S.); and October 18, the Synaxis of the Moscow Hierarchs (October 5 O.S.).

Innocent is widely venerated with the epithet Equal-to-apostles
as the Orthodox apostle of America.

On the liturgical calendar of the Episcopal Church (USA), Innocent is honored with a feast day on March 30.

Works 
In the Aleut language – Eastern dialect of the Fox Islands:
 Indication of the Pathway into the Kingdom of Heaven Сvнодальная Тvпографiя. Москва – Synodal Printing Press, Moscow, 1840, 1899, Retrieved 2012-01-31
 Beginnings of Christian Teaching and Short Christian Catechism (co-authored with Fr. Jacob Netsvetov) Сvнодальная Тvпографiя. СПб. – Synodal Printing Press, Saint Petersburg, 1840, 1893, Retrieved 2012-01-31

In the Aleut language – Western dialect of Atka Island
 Two Sermons from Saint Nicholas Church in Atka рукопись, о. Атха – manuscript from Atka, 1842, Retrieved 2012-01-31

In the Aleut language – Eastern dialect of the Fox Islands, with footnotes in the Western dialect of Atka Island
 The Holy Gospel According to St. Matthew (translation) Сvнодальная Тvпографiя. СПб. – Synodal Printing Press, Saint Petersburg, 1840, 1896, Retrieved 2012-01-31

In Russian:
 Указание Пути в Царствие Небесное
 Записки об островах Уналашкинского отдела. СПб., 1840. Состоит из трёх частей:
 Часть I, географическая
 Часть II, этнографическая. Замечания об алеутах М.: ЛИБРОКОМ, 2011. — 336 с.
 Часть III, Записки об атхинских алеутах и колошах (колюжах, тлинкитах). М.: УРСС, 2011. — 160 с.
 Автобиографическая записка. М., 1886
 Речь Архимандрита Иннокентия, по наречении его Епископом Камчатским, Курильским и Алеутским, сказанная 1840 года, Декабря 13 дня. Христианское чтение. СПб., 1841
 Письма (1823—1878 гг.) собраны И. Барсуковым, 3 т. СПб, 1897, 1901.
 Творения, три книги, собраны И.Барсуковым. М., 1886–1888.
 Слово при вступлении в управление московской паствою Высокопреосвященного Иннокентия Митрополита Московского, говоренное в большом Успенском соборе, 26-го мая, 1868 года. Православное обозрение. М., 1868, том 26.
 Указание пути в Царствие небесное. М., 1871, см. также Изв. Казан. еп., 1882, No. 7, стр. 151; 1886, No. 7, стр. 180; 1893, стр. 18.
 Наставление высокопреосвященного Иннокентия, бывшего архиепископа Камчатского, Курильского и Алеутского, Нушагакскому миссионеру иеромонаху Феофилу. Церковные ведомости. СПб., 1900
 Русская Церковь и дружба между народами (Ж. М. П., 1959, No. 11, стр. 50).

See also
 Russian colonization of the Americas
 Jacob Netsvetov
 Nikolai Velimirovich
 Patriarch Tikhon of Moscow
 Herman of Alaska
 Sebastian Dabovich
 Mardarije Uskokovich
 Alexander Hotovitzky
 Alexis Toth
 Anatole Kamensky
 Seraphim of Uglich
 Bogoljub Gakovich
 Teofan Beatovich
 Matej Stijačić
 Varnava Nastić
 Justin Popovich
 Peter the Aleut

Citations

General and cited sources 
 Paul Garrett, Saint Innocent, Apostle to America, Saint Vladimir's Seminary Press; Crestwood New York, 1979
Oleg Kobtzeff, "Ruling Siberia: The Imperial Power, the Orthodox Church and the Native People", Siberica, British Siberian Studies Seminar, Cambridge, vol. II, 1984, pp.  6–15.

External links

Alaskan Orthodox Christian texts (Aleut, Tlingit) by St. Innocent (Veniaminov)
Repose of St Innocent the Metropolitan of Moscow the Enlightener of the Aleuts and Apostle to the Americas (Orthodox icon and synaxarion for the March 31 feast)
Glorification of St Innocent the Metropolitan of Moscow and Enlightener of the Aleuts, Apostle to the Americas (October 6 feast)
World Digital Library presentation of Evangelie ot Matfeiaor Gospel of St. Matthew, in Innocent's Aleut script, 1840. National Library of Russia.  Primary source book with summary description, 288 images with enhanced view and zoom features, text to speech capability. Russian, Aleut.  Links to related to content.  Content available as TIF, PDF.  This book is Veniaminov's translation of the Gospel of Matthew from Russian into the Aleut-Fox language.

1797 births
1879 deaths
19th-century American clergy
19th-century Christian saints
19th-century translators
19th-century writers from the Russian Empire
American colonial writers
American saints of the Eastern Orthodox Church
Anglican saints
Demidov Prize laureates
Eastern Orthodox missionaries
Eastern Orthodoxy in Alaska
Linguists from Russia
Linguists of Eskaleut languages
Metropolitans and Patriarchs of Moscow
Missionary linguists
People from Irkutsk Governorate
People of Russian America
Primates of the Orthodox Church in America
Religious leaders from Alaska
Russian America
Russian missionaries
Russian saints of the Eastern Orthodox Church
Translators of the Bible into indigenous languages of the Americas